Gunnebo is a multinational corporation headquartered in Gothenburg, Sweden, specializing in security products mainly in the areas of entrance control and safe storage.

The Gunnebo Group has operations in 25 countries with approximately 3,400 employees and a reported global revenue of MEUR  418 for 2021.

History

Origins
Gunnebo has its roots in the village of Gunnebo in south-east Sweden, where Hans Hultman created a forge in 1764. This small business grew steadily until the formation of Gunnebo Bruks Nya AB in 1889. This company later became known as Gunnebo Industries.

Becoming a listed company
In 1991 HIDEF Kapital AB was formed by the Swedish government as one of eight venture capital companies charged with investing in Swedish companies suffering from the national financial crisis. HIDEF became a listed company on the Swedish Stock Exchange in 1994 and one year later took the name of one of its acquisitions, Gunnebo Industries, to become Gunnebo AB (aktiebolag).

Expansion through acquisitions
At this point Gunnebo began a series of major acquisitions and bought several companies focused on security from sectors such as safes & vaults, cash management, entrance security and electronic security (see section below).

In 2005, Gunnebo Industries and its traditional fencing business was divested from Gunnebo AB.

In 2006, the 30 or so acquisitions made between 1994 and 2004 were brought fully under the umbrella of Gunnebo to create sales companies in 29 different markets around the globe. As the Group developed in growth markets, these were added to through the creation of Gunnebo China (2010), Gunnebo Brazil (2011), Gunnebo Malaysia (2011) and Gunnebo South Korea (2013).

Brands 

The Gunnebo Group owns several major brands within the field of security.

Major acquisitions

Products

Safe storage 
Includes safes, safe deposit lockers and strongrooms. To determine the level of security provided by a safe or vault, there is a grading system from I-XII. A grade is always awarded by an independent body (European Certification Body). Safes with grades up to III are typically used by retailers or in offices, whereas banks tend to use safes and vaults with much higher grades.

Safes can also be constructed to withstand fire and therefore can also carry a fire protection grade. This denotes the type of contents which can be protected (either paper or data media) and the duration of protection (half an hour, one hour or two hours).

Entrance control
Entrance control products include speed gates, turnstiles and other entrance systems which only allow entry to authorised individuals. These are used, for example, in mass transit public transport systems or at stadia to allow passage to only those people carrying a valid ticket. Entrance control is also used in airports to facilitate boarding and immigration control, and to prevent passengers returning from public-side to airside.

References

Swedish brands
Security companies of Sweden
Security equipment manufacturers
Manufacturing companies based in Gothenburg
Companies listed on Nasdaq Stockholm
1764 establishments in Europe
Companies established in 1764